Wang Chen (born June 19, 1986 in Harbin, Heilongjiang) is a Chinese former competitive ice dancer. He competed with Yu Xiaoyang. They are four-time Chinese national champions (2006, 2008, 2010, and 2013), as well as two-time bronze medalists at the Asian Winter Games. Their best score at the Four Continents Figure Skating Competition is 7th place, and at the World Championships is 18th.

Programs

Results
(with Yu)

References

External links

 

1986 births
Living people
Chinese male ice dancers
Figure skaters at the 2007 Winter Universiade
Figure skaters from Harbin
Asian Games medalists in figure skating
Figure skaters at the 2007 Asian Winter Games
Figure skaters at the 2011 Asian Winter Games
Medalists at the 2007 Asian Winter Games
Medalists at the 2011 Asian Winter Games
Asian Games bronze medalists for China
Competitors at the 2005 Winter Universiade
Competitors at the 2009 Winter Universiade